The horadandia, green carplet, or glowlight carplet (Horadandia atukorali), is a species of very small (maximum  total length) cyprinid fish that is found in slow-moving or still fresh and brackish water habitats in western Sri Lanka. Earlier thought to be a monotypic genus with the single species found in both Sri Lanka and India, an analysis published in 2013 showed that the Indian population should be recognized as a separate species, Horadandia brittani.

References

Danios
Cyprinid fish of Asia
Freshwater fish of Sri Lanka
Endemic fauna of Sri Lanka
Fish described in 1943
Taxa named by Paulus Edward Pieris Deraniyagala